The 2021 China League One is the 18th season of the China League One, the second tier of the Chinese football league pyramid, since its establishment in 2004.

Effects of the COVID-19 pandemic
The 2021 China League One season was scheduled to start on 17 March 2021, but later was postponed.

On 1 April, the Chinese Football Association announced that the season would start on 24 April 2021 and the format of the season. The season was divided into 4 stages (10, 8, 8 and 8 rounds respectively). In the first stage, 18 teams were divided into 3 groups based on the hosts and last season's rankings. In the second, third and fourth stage, the teams in 3 groups will be switched to ensure that each team can play against each other 2 times.

Groups
The draw for the stages took place on 1 April 2021.

Centralised venues
Meizhou (Group A, D, G, J)
Hengbei Football Town Field 9
Meixian Tsang Hin-chi Stadium
Wuhua County Olympic Sports Centre
Wuhua County Stadium
Dalian (Group B, F, H)
Dalian Sports Centre Stadium Field 3
Dalian Youth Football Training Base Main Stadium
Jinzhou Stadium
Chengdu (Group L)
Chengdong Sports Park Stadium
Chengdu Longquanyi Football Stadium
Dujiangyan Phoenix Stadium
Shuangliu Sports Centre
Wuhan (Group C, E, I, K)
Hankou Cultural Sports Centre
Tazi Lake Football Base Field 1
Tazi Lake Football Base Field 3
Wuhan Five Rings Sports Center

Dates
 First stage (Round 1-10): 24 April - 10 June
 Second stage (Round 11-18): 11 July -  17 August
 Third stage (Round 19-26): 3 September - 5 October
 Fourth Stage (Round 27-34): 20 November - 22 December

Teams

Team changes

To League One
Teams promoted from 2020 China League Two
 Wuhan Three Towns
 Zibo Cuju
 Nanjing City
 Beijing BIT

From League One
Teams promoted to 2021 Chinese Super League
 Changchun Yatai

Dissolved entries
 Beijing Renhe
 Inner Mongolia Zhongyou
 Taizhou Yuanda

Name changes

Ahead of the 2021 season, the Chinese Football Association ordered all clubs to eliminate any corporate references in their names.

 Chengdu Better City F.C. changed their name to Chengdu Rongcheng in January 2021.
 Guizhou Hengfeng F.C. changed their name to Guizhou in January 2021.
 Nanjing Fengfan F.C. changed their name to Nanjing City in January 2021.
 Jiangxi Liansheng F.C. changed their name to Jiangxi Beidamen in February 2021.
 Heilongjiang Lava Spring F.C. changed their name to Heilongjiang Ice City in February 2021.
 Zhejiang Energy Greentown F.C. changed their name to Zhejiang in February 2021.

Clubs

Stadiums and locations

Club locations

Managerial changes

Foreign players
The number of foreign players clubs can register over the course of the season is limited to four and the number of foreign players allowed on each team at any given time is limited to three. A maximum of three foreign players can be registered for each match with a maximum of two can be fielded at any time during the match. In addition, each club can register a Hong Kong, Macau, or Taiwan player of Chinese descent (excluding goalkeepers), provided that he registered as a professional footballer in one of those three association for the first time, as a native player.
Players name in bold indicates the player is registered during the mid-season transfer window.

 For Hong Kong, Macau, or Taiwanese players, if they are non-naturalized and were registered as professional footballers in Hong Kong's, Macau's, or Chinese Taipei's football association for the first time, they are recognized as native players. Otherwise they are recognized as foreign players.

League table

Results

Positions by round

Results by match played

Promotion play-offs

Zibo Cuju and Chengdu Rongcheng will play the bottom two teams in the 2021 Chinese Super League (7th and 8th in the Relegation stage) in two-legged playoffs.

Relegation play-offs

Overview

Matches

2–2 on aggregate. Qingdao Youth Island won 5–4 on penalties.

Guangxi Pingguo Haliao won 1–0 on aggregate.

Statistics

Top scorers

Hat-tricks

Notes

References

External links

China League One seasons
2
China